There are multiple claims to the world's biggest ball of twine record, all within the United States.

Largest ball of sisal twine built by a community
In Cawker City, Kansas, Frank Stoeber created a ball that had 1.6 million feet (490,000 m) of twine and  when he died in 1974. Cawker City built an open-air gazebo over Stoeber's ball where every August a "Twine-a-thon" is held and more twine is added to the ball. In 2013, its weight was estimated at 19,973 pounds.

Largest ball of sisal twine built by a single person

Darwin, Minnesota, is the home of a ball of baler twine rolled by Francis A. Johnson. Johnson began rolling the twine in March 1950, and wrapped four hours every day for 29 years. The town celebrates "Twine Ball Day" on the second Saturday in August every year. An adjacent volunteer-run, free to visit museum and gift shop has information on the history of the ball, as well as selling a variety of souvenirs. It was the long-standing holder of the "biggest ball of twine" title in the Guinness Book of World Records, holding the title from its completion in 1979 until 1994, and was referenced by "Weird Al" Yankovic in his 1989 song "The Biggest Ball of Twine in Minnesota."

Heaviest twine ball

In Lake Nebagamon, Wisconsin, James Frank Kotera created the heaviest ball of twine ever built. Kotera, known by his initials "JFK," started working on the ball in 1979 and continued until his death in January 2023. The weight of the ball, was estimated by measuring the weight of each bag of twine. The ball is housed in an open-air enclosure in Kotera's lawn; since Kotera's death, the town has fundraised to move it to the town hall. The ball has a smaller companion, "Junior", that is made of string.

Largest nylon twine ball
In Branson, Missouri, a ball of nylon twine built by J. C. Payne of Valley View, Texas, is on display in Ripley's Believe It or Not museum. The ball, which measures 41.5 feet (12.6 m) in circumference, was certified as the world's largest ball of twine by the Guinness Book of World Records in 1993. It is, however, the lightest of the four contenders, weighing 12,000 pounds.

Cultural references
Most notably, one of "Weird Al" Yankovic's original songs is "The Biggest Ball of Twine in Minnesota," from his 1989 album UHF - Original Motion Picture Soundtrack And Other Stuff. Although about the ball in Darwin, Minnesota, Yankovic takes artistic license with the statistics. The location now sports a street sign reading “Weird Alley.”
 In a case of life imitating art, postcards that read "Greetings from the Twine Ball, wish you were here," a fictitious invention of Yankovic's, are now an attraction in Darwin.  The Twineball Inn was a restaurant (not a motel) that has since closed.
Yankovic refers to the ball itself, and thus his previous work, in the video for "White & Nerdy", wherein a Trivial Pursuit card which includes the question "In what city is the largest ball of twine built by one man?" appears on screen.
The Cawker City, Kansas, ball of twine was the subject of the comic strip Doonesbury on July 16, 2012.
In the movie National Lampoon's Vacation, Clark Griswald mentions plans to see a large ball of twine after visiting Cousin Eddie's farm in Kansas.
In the 50 States of Fright three-episode story "America's Largest Ball of Twine (Kansas)", a mother and daughter visit America's Largest Ball of Twine built by Greg Cawker in the fictional town of Francis, Kansas.
The computer game Sam & Max Hit the Road has The World's Largest Ball of Twine as one of the attractions you visit in the game.
The Cawker City, Kansas, ball of twine is mentioned in the Stephen King and Joe Hill's novella In the Tall Grass.
In the movie Sharknado: The 4th Awakens, the World's Biggest Ball of Twine is sucked into a Sharknado, crushing a bystander in the process.

References

External links

 The Battle to Be the World's Largest Ball of Twine, The Atlantic Magazine, September 2014

Tourist attractions in Mitchell County, Kansas
Tourist attractions in Meeker County, Minnesota
Tourist attractions in Taney County, Missouri
Tourist attractions in Douglas County, Wisconsin
Roadside attractions in the United States
Roadside attractions in Kansas
Roadside attractions in Minnesota
Roadside attractions in Wisconsin
Roadside attractions in Missouri
World records
Ropework